This is a list of podcasts that discuss popular culture. Pop culture podcasts often discuss entertainment news and celebrity gossip.

Podcasts

References

Pop Culture
Popular culture studies